Chalkidona Football Club (today A.O. Chalkidona, former Chalkidona-Near East F.C.) is a Greek football club based in Nikaia, in the neighbourhood Chalkidona. The club achieved to play in A Ethniki for two seasons (2003-04 and 2004-05). At the end of the season 2004-05, Chalkidona merged with Atromitos F.C. In fact, Atromitos absorbed Chalkidona and replaced it in the championship. Next, Chalkidona restarted as amateur club and it plays in local Piraeus championship (EPSP). The team's colours are yellow and black (or sometimes blue) and the emblem is the Double-headed eagle.

History
Chalkidona was founded in 1930, originally under the name PAO Chalkidon. At the post war period the club merged with Near East Nikaia and was named Chalkidona Near East. The first success was the season 1960-61 when the club played in B Ethniki (second tier) but relegated immediately. The history of the club changed in the middle of 1990s when the club was bought by businessman Giorgos Spanos. In 1997 Chalkidona promoted to Delta Ethniki (fourth tier). Two years later, in 1999, it promoted to Gamma Ethniki (third tier), in 2001 it promoted to Beta Ethniki and in 2003 promoted to A Ethniki for first time in history. The club played two seasons in A Ethniki until merging with Atromitos. Its presence was successful, since Chalkidona finished in 7th and 8th place of standings, above the middle of standings. Despite the successful presence, Chalkidona hadn't many fans. So, at the end of the season 2004-05 the administration of the club agreed with the most commercial club Atromitos the merge of two clubs. So Atromitos which that year played in Gamma Ethniki replaced Chalkidona in A Ethniki and essentially absorbed Chalkidona. Chalkidona continued as amateur club after merging with the club Proteas Nikaias. In 2010, the club restarted from the lowest local division of Piraeus Championship (EPSP). It achieved to promote in B and after in A local division, one tier lower from the national championships.

Honours

Domestic
Football League
Winners (1): 2002-03
 Delta Ethniki
 Winners (1): 1998-99

Notable players
Thanasis Intzoglou
Nikos Nioplias
Dimosthenis Manousakis
Christos Mikes
Anderson de Lima Freitas
Wander dos Santos Machado
Pierre Ebéde

References

External links
 Official Site

 
Football clubs in Attica
Football clubs in Athens
Association football clubs established in 1930
1930 establishments in Greece
Nikaia-Agios Ioannis Rentis